Anne Bauchens (February 2, 1882 – May 7, 1967) was an American film editor who is remembered for her collaboration over 40 years with the director Cecil B. DeMille. In 1940, she won the Academy Award for film editing.

Personal life 
Originally Roseanne Bauchens, she was born in St. Louis, Missouri, to Otto Bauchens and Louella McKee. She had a brother named Harry. She never married.

Hollywood career
Bauchens was trained as an editor by DeMille, and shared her first credit with him on the film Carmen (1915). Prior to 1918, DeMille had edited, as well as directed, his films. After Carmen and We Can't Have Everything (1918), Bauchens no longer shared the editing credits with DeMille. She edited DeMille's films for the rest of their long careers, through the film The Ten Commandments (1956).

When the Academy Award for Best Film Editing was created in 1934, Bauchens received one of the three nominations for her editing of Cleopatra. She later won the Academy Award for North West Mounted Police (1940) and became the first woman to win the Oscar in that category. She was nominated for the Academy Award for Film Editing again twice, first for The Greatest Show on Earth (1952) and then for The Ten Commandments (1956). In total, Bauchens is credited with editing on 43 films directed by DeMille and on 20 films with other directors.

Despite her long career and her series of awards, the characterizations of Bauchens as an editor are not invariably flattering. Margaret Booth, another film editor, has been quoted as saying in 1965 that "Anne Bauchens is the oldest editor in the business. She was editing for years before I came into the business. DeMille was a bad editor, I thought, and made her look like a bad editor. I think Anne really would have been a good editor, but she had to put up with him — which was something."

Filmography
NOTE:  Some films were released/premiered at the end of a given year, but not copyrighted until the beginning of the following year. The sources themselves are inconsistent as to which date they applied to a given film. Either date might be used in the title of its corresponding Wikipedia article.

Bibliography

References

External links

 
 Anne Bauchens at Women Film Pioneers Project
 

1882 births
1967 deaths
American film editors
American women film editors
Best Film Editing Academy Award winners
Burials at Hollywood Forever Cemetery
Women film pioneers
People from St. Louis